Layton railway station (formerly Bispham railway station  ) is on the Blackpool North to Preston railway line, in Lancashire, England, serving the Blackpool suburbs of Layton and Bispham.  It is managed by Northern and is unstaffed.

History
The PWR was taken over jointly by the Lancashire and Yorkshire Railway (LYR) and the London and North Western Railway (LNWR) in 1849, its title being amended to Preston and Wyre Joint Railway (PWJR). When the station at Layton was opened by the PWJR in May 1867 it was named Bispham, being renamed Layton (Lancs) on 4 July 1938.

It is one of two railway stations in the north of Blackpool. Layton still has the air of an old-fashioned commuter station although these days most workers go from here to Blackpool or Preston. There are two platforms and regular services to and from Blackpool.

The station used to have its own ticket office which closed in May 1994. Also prior to and during World War II the station had extensive sidings for goods wagons and works. Some served the Crossley Bros sawmill which occupied the site of today's Aldi, former  B&Q and former Comet stores. And others served the Borough council's transport depot located on Depot Road

A new overbridge was opened to the public on 15 July 2011.

Services

References

External links

 Blackpool & Fylde Rail Users’ Association—Layton, accessed 17 October 2007

Railway stations in Blackpool
DfT Category F2 stations
Former Preston and Wyre Joint Railway stations
Railway stations in Great Britain opened in 1867
Northern franchise railway stations